John Terrence Catliff (born 8 January 1965) is a Canadian former professional soccer player, who played as a striker. He is the third highest goalscorer of all time of the Canadian national team, with 19 goals between 1984 and 1994.

In 2012 as part of the Canadian Soccer Association's centennial celebration, he was named to the all-time Canada XI men's team.

Club career
Catliff was selected to the All-Ivy League First team as a forward in 1983, 1984, and 1986 while playing for the Harvard Crimson. He was also named to the All-American First Team in 1986. Catliff ended his college career with the Crimson with a total of 34 goals and 15 assists.

Catliff was a Canadian Soccer League star, scoring the second most goals of anyone in the League's six-year history with 69 goals in total. He was a league season scoring champion in 1988 with 22 goals  and in 1990 with 19 goals. He began his CSL career in 1987 playing for the League's inaugural champions, the Calgary Kickers. He then spent the next six seasons with the Vancouver 86ers, who became the CSL champions in four consecutive seasons from 1988 through 1991. Ligament injuries to both knees forced him to retire from professional play in 1994 after two years on the 86ers in the American Professional Soccer League.

International career
Catliff was a member of the quarter-finalist Canadian national team at the 1984 Summer Olympics while still playing at Harvard. He made his senior debut for Canada in a July 1984 friendly match against Chile in Edmonton. Throughout his career, he earned a total of 46 caps while scoring 19 goals. He represented Canada in 12 FIFA World Cup qualification matches. He suffered a serious knee injury in a 1986 World Cup qualifying match away to Honduras. His replacement, George Pakos, scored the only goal in a crucial 1–0 victory. Recovering from injury, he was not named to Canada's roster for the 1986 World Cup, Canada's only appearance until the 2022 World Cup.

His final international game came in June 1994 in a friendly match against the Netherlands.

International goals
Scores and results list Canada's goal tally first.

 Catliff scored a 20th international goal against the United States in the other 1990 North American Championship game, but this match was not considered official.

Personal life
Catliff recently worked as global Vice President of Sales with Helly Hansen outdoor apparel company but now works with Firstar Sports. He lives with his wife Sarah and his three soccer loving sons, Brendan (born 1994), and Jamie (born 1998), and Andrew Catliff (born 1996) John was the team Coach of the Vancouver Football Club Under 14 boys, where his son Jamie played. Catliff is an Honoured member of The Canadian Soccer Hall of Fame.

Honours
Canadian Soccer League: 5
 1987, 1988, 1989, 1990, 1991
Canadian Soccer League Top Goalscorer: 2
 1988, 1990

External links
 / Canada Soccer Hall of Fame

References

1965 births
Living people
Soccer players from Vancouver
All-American men's college soccer players
Association football forwards
Canadian soccer players
Canada men's international soccer players
Canadian expatriate soccer players
Canadian expatriate sportspeople in the United States
Footballers at the 1984 Summer Olympics
Olympic soccer players of Canada
1991 CONCACAF Gold Cup players
CONCACAF Championship-winning players
Harvard Crimson men's soccer players
Calgary Kickers players
Vancouver Whitecaps (1986–2010) players
Canadian Soccer League (1987–1992) players
American Professional Soccer League players
Expatriate soccer players in the United States
Canada Soccer Hall of Fame inductees